Józef Krzymiński (1 March 1858, Kaleje - 20 October 1940) was a Polish physician, social and political activist, and a member of parliament. In March 1940, he was arrested by the Nazi occupation authorities and died in a concentration camp close to Inowrocław on 20 October 1940.

References

 Witold Jakóbczyk, Przetrwać na Wartą 1815-1914, Dzieje narodu i państwa polskiego, vol. III-55, Krajowa Agencja Wydawnicza, Warszawa 1989

1858 births
1940 deaths
People from Śrem
People from the Province of Posen
Polish Party politicians
Members of the 9th Reichstag of the German Empire
Members of the 10th Reichstag of the German Empire
Members of the 11th Reichstag of the German Empire
20th-century Polish physicians
19th-century Polish physicians
Polish deputies to the Reichstag in Berlin